Gandhinagar is the capital of the state of Gujarat in India. Gandhinagar is located approximately 23 km north of Ahmedabad, on the west central point of the Industrial corridor between Delhi, the political capital of India, and Mumbai, the financial capital of India.

Gandhinagar lies on the west bank of the Sabarmati River, about 545 km (338 miles) north of Mumbai and 901 km (560 miles) southwest of Delhi. 
The Akshardham temple is located in Gandhinagar. There was a determination to make Gandhinagar a purely Indian enterprise, partly because the state of Gujarat was the birthplace of Mahatma Gandhi. For this reason, the planning was done by two Indian town planners: Prakash M Apte and H. K. Mewada, who had apprenticed with Le Corbusier in Chandigarh.

History
The city was planned by Chief Architect H.K. Mewada, a Cornell University graduate, and his assistant Prakash M Apte.

Demographics
 census of India, Gandhinagar had a population of 208,299. Males constitute 53% of the population and females 47%. Gandhinagar has an average literacy rate of 90%. Male literacy is 91%, and female literacy is 89%. In Gandhinagar, 11% of the population is under 6 years of age. Over 95% of the population of Gandhinagar are Hindus.

Geography

The city sits on the banks of the Sabarmati River, in north-central-east Gujarat. The 20,543 km2 area around Gandhinagar is defined by Gujarat capital territory. The river frequently dries up in the summer, leaving only a small stream of water. Gandhinagar is India's tree capital With 54% green cover on its land area.

Climate

Gandhinagar has a tropical wet and dry climate with three main seasons: summer, monsoon and winter. The climate is generally dry and hot outside of the monsoon season. It is pleasant in the winter days and quite chilling in the night during December to February. The southwest monsoon brings a humid climate from mid-June to mid-September.

Governance and politics

On 1 May 1960, Gujarat was created out of the 17 northern districts of the former State of Bombay. These districts were further subdivided later on. There are 33 administrative districts in the state. Gandhinagar is a political hub for the state of Gujarat.

Congress won the first municipal election in 2011. Mahendrasinh Rana became the first mayor of the city. The current Member of the Lok Sabha for Gandhinagar is Amit Shah from the Bharatiya Janata Party (BJP).

Gandhinagar is also situated near the west command post of the Indian Army and Indian Air force and also has a command centre in the city.

Gandhinagar has recently developed the Gujarat State Emergency Disaster Management centre.

Transport

Air
Sardar Vallabhbhai Patel International Airport located in Ahmedabad is 18 km away from Gandhinagar, providing both domestic and international flights.

Rail
Gandhinagar Capital railway station (GNC) is located in Sector 14. Many trains running on the western zones pass through Gandhinagar. Currently, there are five trains running from this station in which three are express trains and two are MEMU trains. Jaipur-Bandra Garib Rath, Haridwar mail for Delhi and Haridwar and Shanti Express for Indore Junction BG are main express trains running through this station.

Ahmedabad Railway Station (ADI) in Kalupur Ahmedabad is the nearest rail junction (25 km away) which provides connectivity with all the major cities and towns of India. The Indian Railways transports are available for moving in northern India and eastern India from Kalol Junction railway station (KLL).

Metro
Under Phase II of the Ahmedabad Metro, total 22.8 km long network connecting Gandhinagar with Ahmedabad is being constructed. The North-South line of the Ahmedabad Metro is being extended from Motera station to Mahatma Mandir station. A branch line will connect GNLU station to GIFT City station.

See also 
 Software Technology Parks of India
 Gujarat National Law University (GNLU)

References

External links

 
 Gandhinagar Urban Development Authority 
 Gandhinagar Municipal Corporation

 
Cities and towns in Gandhinagar district

Indian capital cities
Memorials to Mahatma Gandhi
Planned cities in India
Articles containing potentially dated statements from 2001
All articles containing potentially dated statements